Rafael Romero de Torres (1865, Córdoba - 19 July 1898, Córdoba) was a Spanish painter, from a family of artists.

Life and work 
His father was the painter Rafael Romero Barros. He showed a talent for art an early age, so he was enrolled at the Escuela provincial de Bellas Artes. 

There, he studied sculpture as well as painting. Winning several prizes encouraged him to extend his stay there. In 1885, he was presented with a second scholarship from the Diputación, for his painting Sin trabajo ("Out of Work", or "Unemployed"), which provided him with sufficient funds to spend three years in Rome. There, he befriended other Spanish artists, including the sculptor, Mateo Inurria, and Marceliano Santa María. In 1945, the latter wrote memoirs, recalling the times he spent with Romero and others at the Antico Caffè Greco.

In 1888, he returned to Spain; alternating his residence between Córdoba and Madrid. Much of his work involved socially conscious themes. In 1890, he participated in the National Exhibition of Fine Arts. Quite pleased at having received a second-class medal on his first try, he was disappointed when behind-the-scenes reconsiderations took place, the second-class medal was taken away, it was awarded to someone else, and he was given a third-class medal instead. According to his friend, : "That injustice produced an indescribable impression on him; it dispelled his illusions, killed his hopes and why not say so? It cost him his life."

After that, he produced only enough to provide himself with basic necessities. His neglect eventually led to a decline in his health, and he contracted a disease that led to his death.

References 

 Brief biography @ Córdobapedia

Further reading 
 Fuensanta García de la Torre, Dibujos del Museo de Bellas Artes de Córdoba, Junta de Andalucía, 1997

External links 

1865 births
1898 deaths
Spanish painters
Spanish genre painters
Real Academia de Bellas Artes de San Fernando alumni
People from Córdoba, Spain